The Department of Passport is a government agency of Nepal assigned with the responsibilities of issuing Passports to the Nepalese citizens and Travel Documents to the legally applicable persons under Ministry of Foreign Affairs.

History

Until 31 March 2010, Nepal still issued hand-written Passports. However, as a member of International Civil Aviation Organization, Nepal was obliged to issue machine-readable passports. The Central Passport Office stopped issuing hand-written passports on 31 March 2010 and had to be withdrawn from circulation as of November 2015. On 26 December 2010, the Office introduced machine-readable passports and issued them thereafter. As of 2021, Nepal began issuing E-passport to replace the Machine-readable passport.

References

Government departments of Nepal
Passport offices
2012 establishments in Nepal